William Bennet or Bennett  (c. 1767 – c. 1833 or after), born at Combe-in-Teignhead, Devonshire, was an English musician, a composer, organist and pianist.

Bennet's father was a landowner in Devon, but had himself been organist of St Andrew's Church, Plymouth.  As a young man Bennet was taught at Exeter, but he later moved to London where he studied with Johann Christian Bach and with Johann Samuel Schroeter.   Returning to the west of England, in 1793 he took up an appointment as organist at St Andrew's, Plymouth, and in 1797 he married a Miss Debell. His compositions include music for piano and organ, and anthems and songs for voice. In 1820 he wrote an  anthem for the coronation of King George IV. Nothing is known of his life after this date, but he may still have been at St Andrew's in 1833.

References

1767 births
1833 deaths
Musicians from Devon
18th-century English musicians
18th-century keyboardists
18th-century pianists
19th-century English musicians
19th-century organists
19th-century pianists
People from Teignbridge (district)
English classical organists
British male organists
English classical pianists
19th-century British male musicians
Male classical organists